The Samish River is approximately 25 miles (40 km) long, in northwestern Washington in the United States. The Samish River originates on a low divide in Whatcom County, and its tributary, Friday Creek, originates in the hills south of Bellingham. The river continues its southwesterly flow through Skagit County and outlets into Samish Bay in Puget Sound.

The Samish River supports a large variety of fish and is home to one of Washington's larger fall King Salmon runs. The Samish River has runs of five Salmon and three trout species including: Spring/Winter Steelhead, Summer Sockeye, Fall Chinook/Chum/Coho, and year-round runs of Cutthroat, and Dolly Varden.  Also documented are Pink Salmon which, while rare, do arrive in small numbers to spawn in the Samish.

There are two fish hatcheries supporting the Samish River. One located in the upper Samish directly below the mouth of Friday Creek, and another several miles up Friday Creek.  Both hatcheries raise Fall Chinook and can process over 10,000,000 salmon smolt a year, 5-20,000 of those returning 1–5 years later to spawn as adults.

See also
List of rivers of Washington
Samish - Native American tribe

References

Rivers of Washington (state)
Rivers of Whatcom County, Washington
Rivers of Skagit County, Washington